Maly Bashchelak is a rural locality (a selo) and the administrative center of Malobashchelaksky Selsoviet, Charyshsky District, Altai Krai, Russia. The population was 836 as of 2013. There are 24 streets.

Geography 
Maly Bashchelak is located 28 km northeast of Charyshskoye (the district's administrative centre) by road. Bolshoy Bashchelak is the nearest rural locality.

References 

Rural localities in Tselinny District, Altai Krai